Mario Vušković (9 September 1953 – 5 July 1985) was a Croatian professional footballer who played most of his career in the Netherlands.

Club career
Having never played for the first team of Hajduk Split, Vušković went on to forge a footballing career in the Netherlands, notching over 70 appearances for Go Ahead Eagles in the Eredivisie.

Personal life and death
Vušković's father, Marko, played for Hajduk Split during World War II, and went on to work as a club executive. His sons, Danijel and Ronald, also went on to play football, with Danijel playing for Hajduk Split and going on to coach their youth teams. His grandsons, Mario, Luka, Moreno and Vito, are also footballers.

He died in a car accident in July 1985, on his way to an NK Omiš game, the club he was playing for at the time.

References

External links
 

1953 births
1985 deaths
Footballers from Split, Croatia
Association football midfielders
Yugoslav footballers
HNK Hajduk Split players
Go Ahead Eagles players
SC Heerenveen players
Eredivisie players
Eerste Divisie players
Yugoslav expatriate footballers
Expatriate footballers in the Netherlands
Yugoslav expatriate sportspeople in the Netherlands
Road incident deaths in Croatia